
Gmina Zbąszynek is an urban-rural gmina (administrative district) in Świebodzin County, Lubusz Voivodeship, in western Poland.

Villages
Apart from the town of Zbąszynek, Gmina Zbąszynek contains the villages and settlements of Boleń, Bronikowo, Chlastawa, Dąbrówka Wielkopolska, Depot, Kosieczyn, Kręcka Winnica, Kręcko, Nowy Gościniec, Rogoziniec, Samsonki and Stradzewo.

Neighbouring gminas
Gmina Zbąszynek is bordered by the gminas of Babimost, Szczaniec, Trzciel and Zbąszyń.

Twin towns – sister cities

Gmina Zbąszynek is twinned with:
 Bedum (Groningen), Netherlands
 Peitz, Germany
 Zbąszyń, Poland

References

Zbaszynek
Świebodzin County